Liberty Township is one of the fifteen townships of Adams County, Ohio, United States.  The 2010 census found 1,965 people in the township.

Geography
Located in the western part of the county, it borders the following townships:
Wayne Township - north
Tiffin Township - east
Monroe Township - southeast
Sprigg Township - south
Huntington Township, Brown County - southwest
Byrd Township, Brown County - west

A small part of the village of West Union, the county seat of Adams County, is located in southeastern Liberty Township.

History
Liberty Township was organized in 1817. It is one of twenty-five Liberty Townships statewide.

Government
The township is governed by a three-member board of trustees, who are elected in November of odd-numbered years to a four-year term beginning on the following January 1. Two are elected in the year after the presidential election and one is elected in the year before it. There is also an elected township fiscal officer, who serves a four-year term beginning on April 1 of the year after the election, which is held in November of the year before the presidential election. Vacancies in the fiscal officership or on the board of trustees are filled by the remaining trustees.

References

External links
County website

Townships in Adams County, Ohio
1817 establishments in Ohio
Populated places established in 1817
Townships in Ohio